Uddanapalle was a state assembly constituency in Tamil Nadu. It was in existence from 1952 to 1971 state elections.

Members of the Legislative Assembly

Madras State

Tamil Nadu

Election results

1971

1967

1962

1957

1952

References

External links
 

Former assembly constituencies of Tamil Nadu
Krishnagiri district